Lady Tholose is the name given to a bronze sculpture from the Toulouse Renaissance, a work by the sculptor Jean Rancy and the bronze caster Claude Peilhot.

Under the features of the goddess Pallas Athena, it is an allegory of the city of Toulouse.

A Renaissance bronze

A masterpiece by Jean Rancy
Demonstrating a remarkable aesthetic and technical mastery for his time, Jean Rancy produced a work that constitutes an essential milestone in French Renaissance sculpture. The fact is all the more noteworthy that it is an extremely rare example of a large bronze figure being cast outside the French royal workshops in the 16th century.

Lady Tholose is distinguished by the mastery of the wet drapery, the science of gestures, torsions and multiple points of vision that Jean Rancy demonstrated early on. If the face with its regular features and wavy hair correspond to the classical canons, the work stands out by its dynamism: camped on a single support, its movement is accompanied by the flight of sinuous and strongly hollowed folds. Its bare bosom and a short antique dress plated by the wind on the generous forms of its body emphasize its feminine sensuality.

Made more than 15 years before Giambologna's Flying Mercury, Lady Tholose is characterized for its technical and aesthetic ambition.

History and tribulations
In 1529, the "image carver" Jean Rancy sculpted a wooden statue of a child representing St. Michael, which was gilded and then placed on the roof of the city's Archives Tower (now called the "Capitole Keep") to serve as a weathervane.

In 1544, this child figure was so damaged that the capitouls commissioned the same Jean Rancy for another statue: Lady Tholose. If the wooden model was made as early as 1544 by Rancy, for lack of money it was not until 1550 that the gunner Claude Peilhot proceeded to cast the bronze in the forges of the city's arsenal.

Gilded with gold leaf and placed atop the Archives Tower, a symbolic place of the capitouls''' power, Lady Tholose brandished a weathervane with its right arm and remained in place until 1829.

At that time the roof of the tower was in danger of collapse and the statue had to be removed. In 1834 it was endowed with wings and crowns and, thus transformed into "Victory" or "Renown", was installed at the top of the colonne Dupuy to pay homage to the military successes of Dominique Martin Dupuy, a Napoleon's general born in Toulouse. As it rusted, the iron shaft that attached the statue to the column was the cause of the corrosion of its legs.

In 2005 it was replaced on the column by a copy. Restored, it became part of the collections of the Musée des Augustins of Toulouse, where it is displayed nowadays.

In 2008 and 2009 it was one of the major pieces in the exhibition "Cast in Bronze: French Sculpture from Renaissance to Revolution" held successively in Paris, New York and Los Angeles.

An allegory with a political purpose
Beyond its artistic aspect, Lady Tholose is also distinguished by the political purpose behind its creation.

A symbol of the affirmation of the power of the capitouls against the royal institutions
The capitouls, the city's consuls who commissioned the work, had imagined Lady Tholose as an allegory to represent the city and the values that ensured its cohesion around the municipal magistrates. It was a question of affirming the power and seniority of the municipal institution as well as its legitimacy in defending the municipal freedoms and privileges conquered in previous centuries, while the royal power and the Parliament of Toulouse were exerting strong pressure to call them into question.

The choice of Lady Tholose to embody this allegory was significant: bronze as a material and especially the figure of the goddess Pallas (Minerva) as a model referred to Roman antiquity and more particularly to the Palladia Tolosa (Palladian Toulouse) evoked by the Latin poets Martial, Ausonius and Sidonius Apollinaris, the ancient Toulouse  that the emperor Domitian had placed under the patronage of Pallas in the first century AD.Jean-Marie Pailler, "Domitian and the 'City of Pallas', a turning point in the history of ancient Toulouse".

In the Renaissance, such an affirmation of municipal power and its personification under the features of an ancient goddess seem unprecedented. As early as 1534, the Municipal annals showed a first manifestation of this: the city is represented by the face of a young woman in the center of a medallion, next to the inscription "LIBERA THOLOSA". The dynamic humanist milieu of Toulouse was certainly at the origin of this evolution, which saw the capitouls abandon the traditional religious images in favor of a pagan figure with historical implications. For the jurisconsult and poet Jean de Boyssoné or the historiographers Nicolas Bertrand, Guillaume de La Perrière and Antoine Noguier, mastery of history was the best asset of political power and they put their know-how at the service of municipal ambitions. Thus, the capitouls presented themselves as "decurions" sitting in a "Capitol", a formula that linked them directly to the city's Roman past and allowed them to claim a continuity of municipal privileges since the emperor Theodosius (although the municipal body was only created in 1147), i.e., an allegedly more ancient and venerable antiquity than that of the Crown of France.Géraldine Cazals, "The constitution of an urban memory in Toulouse (1515-1556)", 2002.

The statue held a weather vane in its right hand and leaned with its left hand on a shield (now disappeared) with the arms of the city. On the shield were inscribed the letters CPQT MDL, that is to say Capitulum Populusque Tolosanum 1550 to, in the manner of the Roman SPQR'', refer to the capitolate and the people of Toulouse.

An allegorical figure declined on other supports
The name and symbolism of Lady Tholose have been used on other media depicting allegories of Toulouse.

Depending on the chroniclers and historians, the same representation could be presented sometimes as Pallas and sometimes as Lady Tholose. If conceptually Pallas could be considered as a simple protector or inspirer of Toulouse, while Lady Tholose would be the representation of the city itself, a certain confusion exists between the various publications and it might seem vain, in the context of Toulouse, to always try to differentiate the goddess from the allegory of the city that she inspired.

See also 
 Capitoul

References

16th-century sculptures
Bronze sculptures in France
Statues in France
Sculptures of women in France
Sculptures of Athena
Allegorical sculptures in France